Man of Marble is a 1977 Polish film directed by Andrzej Wajda. It chronicles the fall from grace of a fictional heroic Polish bricklayer, Mateusz Birkut (played by Jerzy Radziwiłowicz), who became the Stakhanovite symbol of an over-achieving worker, in Nowa Huta, a new (real life) socialist city near Kraków. Agnieszka, played by Krystyna Janda in her first role, is a young filmmaker who is making her diploma film (a student graduation requirement) on Birkut, whose whereabouts seems to have been lost two decades later. The title refers to the propagandist marble statues made in Birkut's image.

Man of Marble reflects director Wajda's emerging hostility to the Stalinist cultural establishment and its oppressive restrictions on artistic expression. The film's plot foretells the Lenin Shipyard strike of 1980 and the rise of the Solidarity Movement.

Plot

Agnieszka is a young filmmaker who is making her film thesis on Mateusz Birkut, a bricklayer elevated as a hero in a stunt to increase construction efficiency and brick quotas. However,  he has since had a fall from grace of the Party and other officials. His current whereabouts seem to have been lost two decades later, and she attempts to piece together the details of his downfall. Agnieszka has difficulty making the film from archival sources and museum collections, but little work remains outside of official propaganda.

Then Agnieszka goes to successful director Jerzy Burski, who recounts the details from the making of his unfinished film, Building Our Happiness. The truth behind the propaganda film comes to light, revealing how Birkut was selected as an example for demonstrating  the progress and efficiency of a new industrial city Nowa Huta. Selected by Jodla, the local Party Secretary, Birkut's fame spread from the bricklaying record of 30,000 bricks in one shift launched him to stardom. Burski does not divulge much about Birkut following his initial rise, but puts her in touch with a man who knew Birkut personally.

Agnieszka then goes to Michalak, an agent of an unnamed state organization who tailed Birkut during his fame. He acted a dual role of security and keeping tabs on Birkut's activities. He shares the details of an accident which stopped Birkut from continuing his bricklaying feats: A heated brick was mixed in with the rest, burning his hands badly. Michalak then sheds light on Birkut's activities after being placed in the inspectorate. A seemingly true believer, Birkut was beloved by the working people and fought for their betterment. Stalled by a lazy and selfish bureaucracy, Birkut loses heart and increasingly butts heads with powerful politicians and officials. At the same time as his own health was failing, Birkut's friend from the bricklaying feats Wincenty Witek is arrested by the state and Birkut fights for his release. Losing hope, Birkut falls into despair and drunkenly attacks a local party building, breaking a window.

Next Agnieszka watches archive newsreels from the trial of Birkut's friend Witek and others in what was known as the trial of the “Skocznia Gang” who sought to reduce worker efficiency and sabotaging construction sites. Witek and Birkut both seem to have been sentenced to prison terms and reeducation.

After the trial and release from reeducation, Witek has successfully turned his career around and is now an important official in Katowice. When interviewed, he recounts Birkut's return from prison, in which Witek has accepted the party line and tries to encourage Birkut to do the same. Throughout Agnieszka's time with him he dodges questions and continuously praises the advances being made at Katowice.

Next the film crew go and interview Hanka, Birkut's wife before his denunciation as a traitor. Yet when she realizes the topic of her interview, she becomes extremely distressed. She recounts the story of how Birkut tracked her down and met with her. Again Birkut is given the opportunity to take advantage of his past and become successful, but again he seems to have turned it down. Hanka has fallen into drunkenness and shame.

Upon reviewing Agniewsza's progress the authorities are displeased, and ultimately rescind support for her movie. Her cameras and film reels she gathered are confiscated. New film of Birkut is found in the archives, but they are not allowed access to editing it and including it in what they have remaining of her film.

Agnieszka's father consoles her about her film and speculates that there must be a single specific reason for the authorities' fear of further disclosure and suggests that she should locate Birkut and talk to him to find out more, even if she is no longer involved in making the film. With this inspiration, Agnieszka tracks down Mateusz's son, Maciej, in the Gdańsk Shipyard. Agnieszka learns from Maciej that his father died years ago. The film ends with Maciej walking into the film office with Agnieszka.

Production

It is somewhat of a surprise that Wajda would have been able to make such a film, sub silentio attacking the socialist realism of Nowa Huta, revealing the use of propaganda and political corruption during the period of Stalinism. The film director presaged the loosening grip of the Soviets that came with the Solidarity Movement, though it has been acknowledged by Polish film historians that due to censorship the script languished in development hell since 1962. The film extensively uses original documentation footage from the construction of Nowa Huta and other subjects of Poland's early communist era, as well as the propagandist/inspirational music of Stalinist Poland.

Agnieszka has trouble making the film from archival sources and museum collections and from interviews with people whose answers provide partial information on Birkut's life, but who don't seem to know about his current location or situation. The authorities decide that the young student digs too deeply into the recent past, and inform her that their permission to create the film is withdrawn. Her equipment and the materials she gathered are confiscated. Agnieszka's father speculates that there must be a single specific reason for the authorities' fear of further disclosure and suggests that she should locate Birkut and talk to him to find out more, even if she is no longer involved in making the film. With this inspiration, Agnieszka tracks down Mateusz's son, Maciej, in the Gdańsk Shipyard. (Both father and son, Mateusz and Maciej, are played by the same actor: Jerzy Radziwiłowicz.) Agnieszka learns from Maciej that his father died years ago.

The ending of Man of Marble leaves the death of Mateusz Birkut ambiguous. In his script, Wajda had wanted to reveal that Mateusz had been killed in clashes at the shipyards in 1970, a major confrontation that prefigured the rise of Solidarity ten years later, but he was prevented by censorship. In 1981, Wajda filmed Man of Iron, a follow-up to Man of Marble, which depicts Maciej's subsequent involvement in the Polish anti-Communist workers' movement. Man of Iron extensively deals with Mateusz's killing in the clashes of 1970. Donota Niemitz and Stefan Steinberg write:

Cast

 Jerzy Radziwiłowicz – Mateusz Birkut / Maciej Tomczyk
 Krystyna Janda – Agnieszka
 Tadeusz Łomnicki – Jerzy Burski
 Jacek Łomnicki – Young Burski
 Michał Tarkowski – Wincenty Witek
 Piotr Cieślak – Michalak
 Wiesław Wójcik – Jodła
 Krystyna Zachwatowicz – Hanka
 Magda Teresa Wójcik – Editor
 Bogusław Sobczuk – TV Producer
 Leonard Zajączkowski – Leonard Zajączkowski, Cameraman
 Jacek Domański – Soundman
 Irena Laskowska – Museum Employee
 Zdzisław Kozień – Agnieszka's Father
 Wiesław Drzewicz – Hanka's Husband
 Saskia Taylor – Hanka's Daughter

Accolades
The film was entered into the Un Certain Regard section at the 1978 Cannes Film Festival and won the FIPRESCI Prize.

Footnotes

Sources 
Niemitz, Dorota. 2014. The legacy of postwar Polish filmmaker Andrzej Munk. World Socialist Web Site. 13 October 2014. https://www.wsws.org/en/articles/2014/10/13/munk-o13.html Retrieved 8 July 2022.

External links 
 
 Man of Marble. Man of Iron. Polish Film and Politics - essay by Lisa DiCaprio (1982) in Jump Cut
 "Andrzej Wajda's Hidden History of the Polish Working Class" by Jakub Majmurek in Jacobin (2020)

1977 films
Films directed by Andrzej Wajda
Films set in Poland
Films set in Kraków
Films set in Warsaw
Films set in Gdańsk
Films shot in Poland
Films shot in Kraków
1970s political drama films
1970s Polish-language films
Polish political drama films
1977 drama films
Films about filmmaking
Films critical of communism